Carl Borivoj Presl (17 February 1794 – 2 October 1852) was a Czech botanist.

Biography
Presl lived his entire life in Prague, and was a professor of botany at the University of Prague (1833–52). He made an expedition to Sicily in 1817, and with his brother, published a "Flora bohemica" titled "Flora čechica: indicatis medicinalibus, oeconomicis technologicisque plantis" in 1819.

His older brother Jan Svatopluk Presl was also a noted botanist; the journal Preslia of the Czech Botanical Society is named in their honor. The botanical genera Preslaea Mart., 1827 from the family Boraginaceae, (now a synonym of Euploca  ) and Preslia Opiz, 1824 of the family Lamiaceae (it is also now a synonym of Woodsia ) are dedicated to the two brothers. In 2006, botanists (Urb. & Gilg) Weigend published Presliophytum, a genus of flowering plants from South America, belonging to the family Loasaceae which also honours Carl Borivoj Presl's name.

He spent nearly 15 years producing the exsiccata "Reliquiae Haenkeanae" (published from 1825 to 1835), a work based on botanical specimens collected in the Americas by Thaddaeus Haenke.

Author abbreviation

See also
 
 Jan Svatopluk Presl (J.Presl, 1791–1849) — Czech chemist/mineralogist/botanist, and older brother of Carl Presl.

References

Bibliography 
 Carl Bořivoj Presl: "Reliquiae Haenkeanae : seu descriptiones et icones plantarum, quas in America meridionali et boreali, in insulis Philippinis et Marianis collegit Thaddaeus Haenke". J.G. Calve, Prague, 1825 to 1835.
 "Flora sicula, exhibens plantas vasculosas in Sicilia aut sponte crescentes aut frequentissime cultas, secundum systema naturale digestas", 1826.
 "Symbolae botanicae, sive, Descriptiones et icones plantarum novarum aut minus cognitarum", 1832.
 "Catalogue of Ferns: After the Arrangement of C. Sprengel", 1841; Whittaker and Company, 1841.
 Hymenophyllaceae, 1845 – Monograph on Hymenophyllaceae.
 "Supplementum Tentaminis Pteridographiae", 1847.
 Die Gefässbündel im Stipes der Farrn, 1848 – The vascular bundles in the stipes of ferns.

External links

 WorldCat

Czech botanists
Czech mycologists
 
Botanists with author abbreviations
1794 births
1852 deaths
Bryologists
Pteridologists
Paleobotanists
19th-century Austrian botanists
Austrian mycologists
Scientists from Prague
Austrian people of Czech descent
19th-century Czech scientists
Burials at Vyšehrad Cemetery